Kelhat (قلحات), Qalhat, Kelhatt, is a Greek Orthodox village in Koura District of Lebanon. It extends from the shores of the Mediterranean Sea to an elevation of around 400m above sea level.

Kelhat contains many educational institutes, covering the Lebanese Educational System from Primary Education to Higher Education, namely, University of Balamand, College Notre Dame du Balamand and Lady of Balamand High School.

Four Greek Orthodox Churches exist in Kelhat, The Church of Saint George and most notably the Balamand Monastery.

Some family names are: Issa (عيسى), Hanna (حنا), Nasr (نصر), Nasrallah (نصرالله), Wehbé (وهبة), Malek (مالك), Sleiman (سليمان), Jabbour (جبور), Bahri (البحري), Jedd (الجد), Nicolas (نقولا), Melais (المليس), Aoun (عون), Murr (مر), Nader (نادر), Khoury (خوري), Saba (سابا), Nehme (نعمة), Moussa (موسى), Chamoun (شمعون), Elias (الياس).

References

External links
 Qalhat, Localiban

Eastern Orthodox Christian communities in Lebanon
Populated places in the North Governorate
Koura District